Ilocos Norte College of Arts and Trades is a public institution in the Philippines founded in 1908. Accredited by the Technical Education and Skills Development Authority, it offers technical and vocational courses as well as teacher education training. Its main campus is located along P. Gomez St., Brgy. San Pedro, Laoag.

History 
In 1906, first year high school classes were established in the Acosta Building, along with elementary grades. The first permanent building, Ilocos Norte Provincial High School, opened in 1909.  By 1916, all four levels of high school courses were taught. 

A new school building was built in 1929 on the present site of Ilocos Norte College of Arts and Trades. In June 1941 that building was razed by fire, and classes were subsequently held in the grandstands of the provincial grounds and in local rented houses. After the Japanese occupation was over, the United States aided in the rehabilitation of the building with the Rehabilitation Act of 1946.

In 1964, the Valdez-Raquiza sponsored Republic Act No. 3989 approved conversion of the school to Ilocos Norte National High School, which was implemented July 1965.

Programs and courses

Technical & Vocational
 Automotive Servicing NC II
 Baking/Pastry Production NC II
 Bartending NC II
 Beauty Care NC II
 Building Wiring Installation NC II
 Commercial Cooking NC II
 Consumer Electronics Servicing NC II
 Dressmaking NC II
 Electrical Installation & Maintenance NC II
 Finishing Course for Call Center Agents NC II
 Food and Beverage Services NC II
 Front Office Services NC II
 Housekeeping NC II
 Mechanical Drafting NC I
 RAC (PACU/CRE) Servicing NC II
 Shielded Metal Arc Welding (SMAW) NC II
 Technical Drafting NC II

Senior High School

Academic Track
 Accountancy, Business and Management
 Humanities and Social Sciences

Technical-Vocational and Livelihood Track
 Home Economics
 Industrial Arts
 Information and Communications Technology

Radio Station
INCAT also operates a radio station DWAT (93.9 FM). It was relaunched on June 15, 2020, in partnership with the Laoag City Schools Division of the Department of Education. It will be used as a tool for students in the province who have no access to online learning.

References

External links
INCAT Supreme Student Government
The Labor and Ang Palihan - Official School Publication
INCAT Debaters' Guild

Schools in Laoag
Education in Ilocos Norte
1908 establishments in the Philippines